Thazhampoo is a 1965 Indian Tamil-language film directed by N. S. Ramadass. The film stars M. G. Ramachandran and K. R. Vijaya. It was released on 23 October 1965.

Plot 

When Kandaswamy, an accountant, goes to his employer to ask for money, he is framed for murder and imprisoned. His brother, Durai, convinced that Kandaswamy is innocent, strives to uncover the plot.

Cast 
 M. G. Ramachandran as Durai
K. R. Vijaya as Kamali
 M. R. Radha as S. P. Raja Ratnam
 M. N. Nambiar as Mohan
 S. A. Ashokan as Kandhasamy
Manimala as Bakiyum
B. V. Radha as Kaveri
 Nagesh as Velu
Manorama as  Velu's love interest
K. R. Ramsingh as Murugan
 M. K. Mustafa as Inspector of police
 Thirupadisamy as S. P. Somanadhan
A. Veerappan as Kamali's car driver

Soundtrack 
The music was composed by K. V. Mahadevan.

Release and reception 

Thazhampoo was released on 23 October 1965, Diwali day. Writing in Sport and Pastime, T. M. Ramachandran called it "a mass entertainer with all conventional cliches".

References

External links 

1960s Tamil-language films
1965 films
Films scored by K. V. Mahadevan